Kim Yun-jae (born May 14, 1990) is a South Korean short track speed skater. He won three distances and the overall classification at the 2008 World Junior Championships in Bolzano.

External links
ISU profile
 2008 ISU World Junior Championships, Italy

1990 births
Living people
South Korean male short track speed skaters
Olympic short track speed skaters of South Korea
Short track speed skaters at the 2014 Winter Olympics
21st-century South Korean people